This is a list of notable musicians who play the Australian instrument known as the didgeridoo.



Australia
Aboriginal Australian players from traditional didgeridoo regions (according to A.P. Elkin, in 1938 the instrument was "only known in eastern Kimberley and the northern third of the Northern Territory"), belonging to clans that claim the didgeridoo as part of their ancient ancestral heritage:
David Blanasi
Ash Dargan
Djalu Gurruwiwi

Aboriginal players from non-traditional didgeridoo regions:
Mark Atkins
William Barton
Adrian Burragubba
Alan Dargin
Ernie Dingo
David Hudson
David Williams

Non-Aboriginal Australian didgeridoo players:
Anthony Field
Rolf Harris
Charlie McMahon
Adam Plack
Xavier Rudd

United States
Stuart Dempster
Stephen Kent
Steve Roach
Graham Wiggins

Performers who use the didgeridoo as a secondary instrument
A number of didgeridoo players are jazz or classical trombonists (or, alternatively, players of other wind or string instruments) who double on the didgeridoo, using it as a secondary instrument. These include:
Art Baron
Brandon Boyd
John Butler
Douglas Ewart
Wycliffe Gordon
Like a Storm
Christian Lindberg
Brendon Urie
Peter Zummo

References 

Didgeridoo
 List